Cathy Lee Crane (born 1962) is a North American experimental films director and producer, based in Ithaca, New York. She was a Guggenheim Fellow in 2013.

Her films include Pasolini's Last Words, focusing on the death and legacy of filmmaker Pier Paolo Pasolini.

Filmography
The Manhattan Front (2017)
Pasolini's Last Words (2012)
Sketches After Halle (1997)

Awards
 1997   Eastman Kodak Award as Most Promising Talents of the Future Generation of Filmmakers
 2013   Guggenheim Fellowship in Film-Video

References

1962 births
Living people